Ad Noctum - Dynasty of Death is the fourth studio album by the Norwegian symphonic black metal band Limbonic Art released in 1999 on Nocturnal Art Productions.

Track listing

Personnel
Daemon - guitars, bass, vocals
Morfeus - keyboards, guitars, samples
Per Eriksen - gong
Peter Lundell - producer, mixing
Olof Karlsson - photography
Kerstin Rossler - photography (live)

External links
Ad Noctum - Dynasty of Death at Allmusic

1999 albums
Limbonic Art albums